David Isakovich Bedzhanyan (born 6 September 1988) is a Russian weightlifter of Armenian descent.

Bedzhanyan won two gold medals at the 2012 and 2013 European Weightlifting Championships.

Major results

References

External links
 
 
 David Bedzhanyan at Lift Up

1988 births
Living people
People from Bolshoy Kamen
Russian people of Armenian descent
Ethnic Armenian sportspeople
Russian male weightlifters
World Weightlifting Championships medalists
Universiade medalists in weightlifting
Universiade bronze medalists for Russia
European Weightlifting Championships medalists
Medalists at the 2013 Summer Universiade
Sportspeople from Primorsky Krai